Cape Winelands Airport (formerly Fisantekraal Airfield) is an ex-South African Air Force airfield built circa 1943, and used to operate Lockheed Ventura bombers.

Cape Winelands Airport serves as a general flying airfield, and is a favourite for flight training in the Cape Town area. Most of the fixed wing and helicopter schools, and Air Mercy Services' Pilatus PC-12 from Cape Town International (FACT) and Morningstar airfield (Morningstar Flight Academy) also visit Cape Winelands Airport for circuit and emergency training. Private and company aircraft sometimes pick up or drop passengers at Cape Winelands Airport .

The largest aircraft to have landed at Cape Winelands Airport was as of 22 August 2017 a Lockheed C-130 Hercules, Call sign 5X-UCF, made several landings. Quite a few advertisements and movies have also been filmed on location at Cape Winelands Airport.

History
Located on a 150 ha site it was built for use by the South African Air Force, circa 1943. Originally, there were four runways. Only two are still in use: RWY23/05 and RWY14/32. The old taxiways and other runways are no longer used, but are still visible from overhead. The airfield was transferred to the local municipality sometime in the 1960s, and it was sold to a private owner in 1993.
In 2021, billionaire Rob Hersov announced his intention to buy the airport and make it a secondary hub for Cape Town.

Aerodrome and airspace information
Cape Winelands Airport airspace is uncontrolled Class G and has a 5 nm radius with its own radio frequency of 131.1 MHz, callsign Winelands Traffic. Joining altitude is restricted to 2000 ft AMSL by the Cape Town TMA sector A that is above Cape Winelands Airport. There is also the Cape Town CTR that is to the southwest of the field approximately 3.5 nm.

Circuits are all flown at 1200 ft AMSL for fixed wing and helicopters, and 900 ft AMSL for microlights, and all turns are made to the left. The circuit is restricted to a 2.5 nm radius from the center of the airfield.

Avgas 100LL fuel and W100 oil is available.

Other information
Magnetic variation is approx 23° W near Cape Winelands Airport. There are tall mountain ranges to the southeast of the field extending to 6600 ft AMSL. The predominant wind in summer is SE and winter NW. Summer can reach to 40 °C at FAWN giving a density altitude max of about 3200 ft. The general flying areas nearby are the FAD200 to the northwest on 124.4 MHz within 10 minutes flying, and FAD69 to the north on 124.2Mhz within five minutes flying.

Operators 
 International Aviation centre South Africa
 Cape Town Flight Training Centre provides Private, Night, Instrument and Commercial flight training
 Sky Messaging provides banner aerotow services
 Working on Fire organisation used to have a summer base at Cape Winelands Airport, but this has recently been closed.

Trivia 
 The Lockheed C-130 Hercules, Call sign 5X-UCF, was flown in as part of The Red Sea Diving Resort (2018) movie that was filmed on location.

References 

Airports in South Africa
Transport in Cape Town